Shanastaq-e Olya (also Romanized as Shanastaq-e ‘Olyā, Shanastagh Olya, Shanstaq-e ‘Olyā, and Shanstaq ‘Ūlīya; also known as Shanastaq-e Bālā, Shanestaq, and Shenastāq-e Bālā) is a village in Afshariyeh Rural District, Khorramdasht District, Takestan County, Qazvin Province, Iran. At the 2006 census, its population was 769, in 176 families.

References 

Populated places in Takestan County